| tries = {{#expr:

 10 + 8 + 4 + 8 + 8 + 4 + 15 + 10 + 8 + 10              
 + 7 + 12 + 4 + 6 + 5 + 5 + 14 + 4 + 5 + 2
 + 9 + 10 + 3 + 8 + 4 + 10 + 6 + 9 + 6 + 5 
 + 10 + 0 + 3 + 8 + 4 + 11 + 1 + 2 + 2  
 + 9 + 13 + 7 + 5 + 8 + 4 + 6 + 11 + 9 + 8 
 + 8 + 16 + 7 + 10 + 8 + 7 + 20 + 2 + 8 + 6
 + 3 + 4 + 7 + 13
 + 5 + 6
 + 4
}}
| top point scorer =  Ihaia West (La Rochelle)(64 points)
| top try scorer =  Peter Betham (Clermont)(10 tries)
|-
| venue               = St James' Park, Newcastle upon Tyne
| attendance2         = 
| champions           =  Clermont
| count               = 3
| runner-up           =  La Rochelle
| website             = EPCR Website
| previous year       = 2017–18
| previous tournament = 2017–18 European Rugby Challenge Cup
| next year           = 2019–20
| next tournament     = 2019–20 European Rugby Challenge Cup
}}

The 2018–19 European Rugby Challenge Cup is the fifth edition of the European Rugby Challenge Cup, an annual second-tier rugby union competition for professional clubs. Including the predecessor competition, the original European Challenge Cup, this is the 23rd edition of European club rugby's second-tier competition. Clubs from five of the nations that participate in the Six Nations Championship (Scotland being the only exception), along with club-sides from Romania and Russia, are competing.

The first round of the group stage began on 12 October 2018, and the competition will end with the final on 10 May 2019 in Newcastle upon Tyne, United Kingdom. This will be the second time the final will be held in England in the era of the current Challenge Cup, and the 12th including finals of the original Challenge Cup.

Teams

A total of 20 teams qualified for the 2018–19 European Rugby Challenge Cup; 18 qualified from across the Gallagher Premiership, Guinness Pro14 and Top 14, as a direct result of their domestic league performance, with two qualifying through the Continental Shield competition. Subject to the allocation of the 20th place in the 2018–19 Champions Cup as per EPCR rules, the distribution of teams was:
 England: five teams
 Any teams finishing between 8th and 11th position in the Gallagher Premiership
 The champion of the Greene King IPA Championship
 France: eight teams
 Any teams finishing between 7th and 12th position in the Top 14
 The champion from the Pro D2
 The winner of the promotion-relegation play-off between the team in 13th position in the Top 14 and the runner-up of the Pro D2
 Ireland, Italy, Scotland and Wales: five teams
 Any teams, excluding the South African teams, that did not qualify for the Champions Cup, through the Guinness Pro14
 No team from Scotland ultimately participated, as Edinburgh and Glasgow Warriors qualified for the 2018–19 Champions Cup.
 Romania: one team
 One team qualified through the 2017–18 Continental Shield.
 Russia: one team
 One team qualified through the 2017–18 Continental Shield.

The following clubs qualified for the Challenge Cup.

Qualifying competition – European Rugby Continental Shield

The qualification tournament was reformatted as a competition in its own right, the European Rugby Continental Shield, in 2017. Eight teams were split into two pools of four to compete in the pool stage of the European Rugby Continental Shield. Each team played the four teams in the other pool once. The winner of each pool then played-off against the runner-up of the other pool. The winners of these two qualifying play-offs played each other in a two-legged play-off for a place in the Challenge Cup.

The two Russian teams who had competed in the 2017–18 tournament played each other in a two-legged qualifying play-off for a place in the Challenge Cup. The winners of the two qualifying play-offs, having both qualified for the Challenge Cup, then played each other in the European Rugby Continental Shield final in May 2018.

Pool play-offs

|}

Qualifying play-offs

|}

Continental Shield Final

Ineligible teams
Heidelberger RK were due to become the first German club to take part in either of the two major European rugby union competitions after qualification from the 2017–18 European Rugby Continental Shield. However, they were ruled ineligible by EPC Rugby due to their primary financial backer, Hans-Peter Wild, also being the majority shareholder in Stade Français and therefore being in a position to influence two teams in the competition.

Timișoara Saracens, who had been eliminated by Heidelberger RK at the Continental Shield semi-final stage (effectively the Challenge Cup play-off)  were confirmed as their replacement on 11 June 2018.

Team details
Below is the list of coaches, captain and stadiums with their method of qualification for each team.

Note: Placing shown in brackets, denotes standing at the end of the regular season for their respective leagues, with their end of season positioning shown through CH for Champions, RU for Runner-up, SF for losing Semi-finalist and QF for losing Quarter-finalist.

Seeding
The 20 competing teams were seeded and split into four tiers; seeding was based on performance in their respective domestic leagues. Where promotion and relegation is in effect in a league, the promoted team was seeded last, or (if multiple teams are promoted) by performance in the lower competition.

Teams are taken from a league in order of rank and put into a tier. A draw is used to allocate two second seeds to Tier 1; the remaining team goes into Tier 2. This allocation indirectly determines which fourth-seeded team entered Tier 2, while the others enter Tier 3.

Given the nature of the Continental Shield — a competition including developing rugby nations and Italian clubs not competing in the Pro14 — the two qualifiers from that competition were automatically included in Tier 4 and are seeded equally, despite officially being ranked 1 and 2 from that competition.

The brackets show each team's seeding and their league (for example, 1 Top 14 indicates the team was seeded 1st from the Top 14).

Pool stage

The draw took place on 20 June 2018 in the Olympic Museum, Lausanne, Switzerland.

Teams in the same pool play each other twice, both at home and away in the group stage started in October 2018, and continues through to January 2019. The pool winners and three best runners-up progressed to the quarter finals.

Teams are awarded competition points, based on match result. Teams receive four points for a win, two points for a draw, one attacking bonus point for scoring four or more tries in a match and one defensive bonus point for losing a match by seven points or fewer.

In the event of a tie between two or more teams, the following tie-breakers will be used, as directed by EPCR:
 Where teams have played each other
 The club with the greater number of competition points from only matches involving tied teams.
 If equal, the club with the best aggregate points difference from those matches.
 If equal, the club that scored the most tries in those matches.
 Where teams remain tied and/or have not played each other in the competition (i.e. are from different pools)
 The club with the best aggregate points difference from the pool stage.
 If equal, the club that scored the most tries in the pool stage.
 If equal, the club with the fewest players suspended in the pool stage.
 If equal, the drawing of lots will determine a club's ranking.

Pool 1

Pool 2

Pool 3

Pool 4

Pool 5

Ranking of pool leaders and runners-up

Knock-out stage

Format
The eight qualifiers are ranked according to their performance in the pool stage and compete in the quarter-finals which will be held on the weekend of 28–31 March 2019. The four top teams will host the quarter-finals against the four lower teams in a 1v8, 2v7, 3v6 and 4v5 format.

The semi-finals will be played on the weekend of 19–21 April 2019. As in recent seasons, a fixed semi-final bracket is set in advance. However, beginning this season the higher-seeded team will host each semi-final regardless of whether they won their quarter-final at home or on the road.

The winners of the semi-finals will contest the final, at St James' Park, on 10 May 2019.

Bracket

Quarter-finals

Semi-finals

Final

Attendances
 Does not include the attendance at the final as it takes place at a neutral venue.

Individual statistics
 Points scorers includes tries as well as conversions, penalties and drop goals. Appearance figures also include coming on as substitutes (unused substitutes not included).

Top points scorers

Top try scorers

Season records

Team
Largest home win — 108 points
111–3 Northampton Saints at home to Timișoara Saracens on 18 January 2019
Largest away win — 61 points
82–21 La Rochelle away to Enisei-STM on 13 October 2018
Most points scored — 111 points 
111–3 Northampton Saints at home to Timișoara Saracens on 18 January 2019
Most tries in a match — 17
Bristol Bears at home Enisei-STM on 19 January 2019
Most conversions in a match — 13
Northampton Saints at home to Timișoara Saracens on 18 January 2019
Most penalties in a match — 5
La Rochelle away to Zebre on 19 January 2018
Most drop goals in a match — 2
Clermont at home to Harlequins on 20 April 2019

Player
Most points in a match — 25 (2)
 Maxime Lafage for La Rochelle away to Enisei-STM on 13 October 2018
 Andy Uren for Bristol Bears at home Enisei-STM on 19 January 2019
Most tries in a match — 5
 Andy Uren for Bristol Bears at home Enisei-STM on 19 January 2019
Most conversions in a match — 11 (2)
 James Grayson for Northampton Saints at home to Timișoara Saracens on 18 January 2019
 Callum Sheedy for Bristol Bears at home Enisei-STM on 19 January 2019
Most penalties in a match — 5
 Ihaia West for La Rochelle away to Zebre on 19 January 2019
Most drop goals in a match — 2
 Camille Lopez for Clermont at home to Harlequins on 20 April 2019

Attendances
Highest — 28,438
Clermont versus La Rochelle on 10 May 2019 (Final)
Lowest — 100
Enisei-STM at home to Bristol Bears on 12 January 2019
Highest average attendance — 16,152
Clermont
Lowest average attendance — 1,100
Enisei-STM

See also
2018–19 European Rugby Champions Cup
 2018–19 European Rugby Continental Shield

Notes

References

 
European Rugby Challenge Cup
European Rugby Challenge Cup
European Rugby Challenge Cup
European Rugby Challenge Cup
European Rugby Challenge Cup
European Rugby Challenge Cup
European Rugby Challenge Cup
European Rugby Challenge Cup
European Rugby Challenge Cup
EPCR Challenge Cup seasons
European Rugby Challenge Cup